"Everyday" is the closing track and third radio single from Dave Matthews Band's album Everyday. It reached #38 on Modern Rock Tracks, and #8 on Adult Top 40. A live version of "Everyday" is featured on the Dave Matthews Band compilation album The Best of What's Around Vol. 1. The song evolved from an earlier DMB song entitled "#36" and references The Beatles' song All You Need Is Love.

When the song is played live, the song "#36" is mixed in with the song "Everyday." It is also a tradition for the crowd to sing, "Hani, Hani, come and dance with me" during the parts of the song that #36 mixes in with.  This can be heard on such CDs as The Best of What's Around Vol. 1, Live Trax Vol. 6, The Gorge, Live at Folsom Field, Boulder, Colorado, and on Weekend on the Rocks.

An acoustic version of the song was played live on February 28, 2001 by Dave Matthews and Trey Anastasio during the latter's solo performance at the Landmark Theatre in Richmond, Virginia.

On September 21, 2001, Dave Matthews played an acoustic version of the song as part of the America: A Tribute to Heroes concert, performed in remembrance of the victims of the September 11 attacks.

The song was not originally supposed to be the third single from the album. "When the World Ends" was originally supposed to be the single, but after 9/11 it was thought that the dark title would not be appropriate.

The song has enjoyed consistent popularity as a live staple and has been played live every year since its release (2001–2018). As of 2018, it has been the most played live song from the Everyday album.

Music video
A music video for the song was concepted and directed by then TBWA\Chiat\Day North America creative director Chuck McBride, cinematographed by Lance Acord and produced by Tim Harman through New York production company cYclops in 2001. It features actor Judah Friedlander walking around hugging people (mostly in the band's hometown of Charlottesville, Virginia and Greenwich Village), including Conan O'Brien, Vincent Pastore, Sheryl Crow, Blue Man Group, Tiki Barber and Hallie Kate Eisenberg, as well as the band themselves. The video is a response to the general feeling immediately following the September 11th attacks.

In popular culture
The song was parodied by Jimmy Fallon in his opening act for the 2002 MTV Video Music Awards.

The song was featured in the third episode of The Paper, after Alex and his new girlfriend kiss for the first time at a Dave Matthews Band concert.

In its original form as "#36" the song was written in response to the assassination of Chris Hani, who worked to end South African apartheid.

The 2006 "Free Hugs Campaign" video, which spawned the eponymous social movement, features an Australian man using the pseudonym Juan Mann offering unconditional hugs to strangers.

Track listing
"Everyday" (radio edit) – 4:10
"Everyday" (album version) – 4:44
"Everyday" (live version) – 9:31

Charts

References

Dave Matthews Band songs
2001 singles
Songs written by Dave Matthews
2000 songs
Song recordings produced by Glen Ballard
RCA Records singles
Songs written by Glen Ballard